Spy-fi may refer to:

 Spy fiction, the traditional meaning of the term
 Spy-fi (subgenre), a subgenre of spy fiction that includes elements of science fiction